Christine Price (née Haskett; born 30 November 1952) is a former British middle- and long-distance runner, who represented Scotland.

At the 1970 British Commonwealth Games she placed eighth in the 1500 metres and at the 1986 Commonwealth Games tenth in the 10,000 metres.

Ten times she started at the World Cross Country Championships, with following places:

 1973 in Waregem: 27th
 1974 in Monza: 33rd
 1975 in Rabat: 23rd
 1976 in Chepstow: 23rd
 1977 in Düsseldorf: 61st
 1981 in Madrid: 68th
 1982 in Rome: 36th
 1985 in Lisbon: 94th
 1986 in Colombier: 57th
 1987 in Warsaw: 81st

External links 

 Profile at TOPS in athletics
 Profile at Power of Ten

1952 births
British female middle-distance runners
British female long-distance runners
Commonwealth Games competitors for Scotland
Athletes (track and field) at the 1970 British Commonwealth Games
Athletes (track and field) at the 1986 Commonwealth Games
Living people